Hamid Ahadad (born 2 July 1995) is a Moroccan footballer currently playing for Botola club Wydad AC as a forward.

International career

International goals
Scores and results list Morocco's goal tally first.

Honours
Raja Casablanca 
Botola: 2019–20

Zamalek SC
Egyptian Premier League 2020-21
 Saudi-Egyptian Super Cup: 2018
 CAF Confederation Cup: 2018–19

Individuale 
Raja CA Goal of the Month: March 2022

References

External links

Moroccan footballers
Moroccan expatriate footballers
1994 births
Living people
People from Agadir
Difaâ Hassani El Jadidi players
Zamalek SC players
Raja CA players
Botola players
Egyptian Premier League players
Association football wingers
Expatriate footballers in Egypt
Moroccan expatriate sportspeople in Egypt
Morocco international footballers